Theron David Read (September 25, 1964 – July 20, 2009), was an American film actor.

Career
He was most remembered for his role as Mark Bojeekus in the 1987 comedy Three O'Clock High.  He also had parts in the films Plan 10 from Outer Space, Teenage Bonnie and Klepto Clyde, Neon City, Promised Land, and High School Spirits. He also appeared in the 1989 slasher sequel Halloween 5: The Revenge of Michael Myers, although his scenes were ultimately cut from the final film; for years, the footage was considered lost, but it was eventually re-discovered by Scream Factory in 2021, and was included as a bonus feature on the company's 4K UHD Blu-Ray release of the film that same year, making the long-lost footage viewable for the first time ever.

Death
Read was found dead on a TRAX light-rail train in Salt Lake City, Utah, on July 20, 2009.  His death was discovered by authorities when he failed to deboard the train at its last stop. He died of congestive heart failure. His remains were interred in Elysian Burial Gardens in Millcreek, Utah on July 27, 2009.

Filmography

References

External links

1964 births
2009 deaths
American male film actors
Male actors from Utah
Male actors from Burbank, California
20th-century American male actors